Brandon Peniche (born Brandon Arturo Delgadillo Ortiz on August 3, 1987) is a Mexican actor. He is the son of one of the most famous telenovela actors of all time, legend of Mexican television Arturo Peniche and Gaby Ortiz. Brandon also has one sister Khiabet. He is married with Kristal Cid, daughter of Mexican actress Sharis Cid. He has one daughter Alessia born 2018. And Bosco born in 2020

Filmography

Awards and nominations
2016 - TVyNovelas Award for Best Young Lead Actor

References

External links

1987 births
Living people
Mexican male telenovela actors
Mexican male television actors
People from Mexico City
21st-century Mexican male actors